Pimelea drummondii is a species of flowering plant in the family Thymelaeaceae and is endemic to near-coastal areas of southern Western Australia. It is an erect, slender shrub with narrowly elliptic or elliptic leaves arranged in opposite pairs, and white or cream-coloured flowers surrounded by 3 or 4 pairs of pale green to yellowish involucral bracts.

Description
Flowering mainly occurs from June to August.

Taxonomy
This species was first formally described in 1852 by Nikolai Turczaninow who gave it the name Calyptrostegia drummondii in the Bulletin de la Société Impériale des Naturalistes de Moscou from specimens collected by James Drummond. In 1988, Barbara Lynette Rye changed the name to Pimelea drummondii in the journal Nuytsia. The specific epithet (drummondii) honours the collector of the type specimens.

Distribution and habitat
Pimelea drummondii grows in sandy soil on coastal sand dunes or in sandy soil over granite between Mount Gardner and Israelite Bay in near-coastal areas of the Esperance Plains, Jarrah Forest and Mallee bioregions of southern Western Australia.

Conservation status
This pimelea is listed as "not threatened" by the Government of Western Australia Department of Biodiversity, Conservation and Attractions.

References

drummondii
Malvales of Australia
Flora of Western Australia
Plants described in 1852
Taxa named by Nikolai Turczaninow